Oleksandr Tikhonov (11 September 1938 – 25 February 2019) was a Ukrainian pharmacist, Doctor of Pharmacy, Distinguished Professor at the National University of Pharmacy, and President of the Ukrainian Association of Apitherapists. He was Academician of the Ukrainian Academy of Sciences (from 2006), Honored Scientist of the Ukraine (1990), and Laureate of the State Prize of Ukraine in Science and Technology for the year 2013.

Career
Tikhonov graduated from the National University of Pharmacy in 1961.
He worked at the Zaporizhia State Medical University and in 1969 he defended his Candidate of Sciences dissertation.
After 1982 he worked at his alma mater, where he was a professor from 1984. In 1983, he defended his doctoral dissertation.

From 1985 to 2012, Tikhonov headed the Department of Pharmacy Technology of Drugs (ATL) at the National University of Pharmacy; he also served as vice chancellor of the university from 1991 to 2002.

Monographs
 — 384 p.
 dr hab. Bogdan Kedzia / Tichonov A.I., Jarnych T.G., Czernych W.P., Zupaniec I.A., Tichonowa S.A. — Drukaznia «Marka». — Kraków. — 2005. — 274 p.
 — 308 p.
 — 274 p.
 — 263 p.
 — 280 p.
 — 240 p.

References

External links
 
Тихонов Александр Иванович 

1938 births
2019 deaths
Scientists from Kharkiv
Ukrainian pharmacists
Apitherapists
Recipients of the Order of Merit (Ukraine), 2nd class
Recipients of the Order of Merit (Ukraine), 3rd class
Laureates of the State Prize of Ukraine in Science and Technology